Donald MacRae Morrison (July 14, 1923 – January 25, 2001) was a Canadian professional ice hockey centre who played 112 games in the National Hockey League with the Detroit Red Wings and Chicago Black Hawks between 1947 and 1951.

Career statistics

Regular season and playoffs

External links
 

1923 births
2001 deaths
Canadian ice hockey centres
Chicago Blackhawks players
Detroit Red Wings players
Ice hockey people from Saskatchewan
Indianapolis Capitals players
Omaha Knights (USHL) players
St. Louis Flyers players
Sportspeople from Saskatoon